Wilhelm Bernardo Walter Cramer (1 May 1886, Leipzig, Kingdom of Saxony – 14 November 1944, Berlin) was a German businessman from Leipzig and a member of the failed 20 July Plot to assassinate Adolf Hitler at the Wolf's Lair in East Prussia.

Life 
In 1919, Cramer became managing director of the Kammgarnspinnerei Gautzsch AG, a worsted yarn spinning mill. From 1923, he was on the board of directors of the Leipziger Kammgarnspinnerei Stöhr & Co. AG, another corporation in the same industry. In the first half of the 1940s, Cramer took part in civilian resistance against the Nazi régime with Leipzig's former mayor Carl Friedrich Goerdeler (1884-1945). After the attempt on the Führer's life failed on 20 July 1944, Cramer was seized on 22 July, and later found guilty at the Volksgerichtshof of treason and high treason, for which he was sentenced to death. He was hanged at Plötzensee Prison in Berlin on 14 November 1944.

Honours
In 1945, a street in the Gohlis neighbourhood of Leipzig was named Walter-Cramer-Straße after him. The City of Leipzig also honoured Walter Cramer with a monument in the Johannapark in 1996.

External links 
 

1886 births
1944 deaths
People educated at the St. Thomas School, Leipzig
German National People's Party politicians
German resistance members
People from the Kingdom of Saxony
Businesspeople from Leipzig
People condemned by Nazi courts
Executed German Resistance members
People from Saxony executed at Plötzensee Prison
Executed members of the 20 July plot
People executed by hanging at Plötzensee Prison